Play Witcha Mama is the third album by rapper Willie D. It was released in 1994 through Willie D's independent Wize Up Records label. Ice Cube, appearing in the title track, as well as Mr. Cheeks, who appears on "Smoke'm", are the album's only featured artists other than Willie D's protégés.

Track listing
 Recipe 4 A Murder
 Is It Real (My Mind Still Playin' Tricks On Me)
 Play Witcha Mama (Featuring Ice Cube)
 Rap Rehab
 Creepin' (Featuring Sho)
 They Laphin' Atcha
 Throat (Featuring Rasir X, Sho, & Gerome Hulett)
 Somethin' Good
 Guess My Religion
 Watcha Know About That
 Doin' the Nasty
 I Wanna Fuck Your Mama
 Smoke'm (Featuring Mr. Cheeks and Sho)
 Niggas Are Dyin'
 U Got Homeboys, We Got Homeboys
 I Ain't Changin' Shit

Charts

References

1994 albums
Willie D albums
G-funk albums